Robert "Bobby" Hallam Symonette (31 January 1925 – 1 March 1998) was a Bahamian yachtsman, businessman and politician.

Bobby Symonette was an accomplished international yachtsman. He represented the Bahamas at five Olympic Games, at Melbourne in 1956, Rome in 1960, Tokyo in 1964, Mexico in 1968 and Munich in 1972.  Symonette twice won gold in the 5.5 metre keelboat event at the Sailing World Championships, in Sydney in 1980 and 1986.  He also won silver at three World Championships in 1962 in Poole, Dorset, England, in 1973 in Lysekil, Sweden and in 1977 at Bénodet, France.

Symonette was a founding member of the Nassau Yacht Club and an International Yacht Racing Union judge.  Symonette served as President of the Bahamas Olympic Association from 1957 to 1972. In 1977 hosted the International 5.5 Metre Class World Championship and the Scandinavian Gold Cup in the waters off Key Biscayne, FL.

Symonette was also a member of a prominent Bahamian political family.  Bobby Symonette was the son of Sir Roland Symonette, the first Premier of the Bahama Islands and his second wife, the former Thelma Bell Clepper of Andalusia, Alabama.  Symonette was also the half-brother of Brent Symonette, the former Deputy Prime Minister of the Bahamas and Deputy Leader Free National Movement (FNM).

Bobby Symonette served formerly as Speaker of the Bahamas' House of the Assembly from 1962 to 1967.

References

External links
 
 
 
 
 

1925 births
1998 deaths
Bahamian male sailors (sport)
Bahamian sportsperson-politicians
Bahamian people of English descent
Speakers of the House of Assembly of the Bahamas
Free National Movement politicians
Children of national leaders
Bahamian people of American descent
Olympic sailors of the Bahamas
Sailors at the 1960 Summer Olympics – 5.5 Metre
Sailors at the 1964 Summer Olympics – 5.5 Metre
Sailors at the 1972 Summer Olympics – Soling
World Champions in 5.5 Metre
World champions in sailing for the Bahamas